"Maverick" is a single released by D'espairsRay on February 12, 2003. It was re-released on March 26, 2003, coming in a DVD-case rather than a normal jewel case. This is also the last release by D'espairsRay on which their name is stylised as "+D'espairsRay+".

Track listing

The songs "Marry of the Blood" and "Yami ni Furu Kiseki" were re-recorded for the Born EP
 The Born versions of "Maverick" and "Yami ni Furu Kiseki" were remastered for their greatest hits album, Immortal
 The song "Yami ni Furu Kiseki" was remade for the  Horizon single
Only 5000 copies were pressed at first. There were even less copies pressed for the second pressing; only 3000 copies.
 The song "Marry of the Blood" appears on the band's B-side compilation album, Antique.

2003 songs
2003 singles
D'espairsRay songs